Leptothele is a genus of Southeast Asian spiders in the family Euagridae first described by Robert Raven & Peter J. Schwendinger in 1995, and is native to the Malay Peninsula.  It contains the two species, Leptothele bencha and L. chang.

References

Euagridae